Gushchino is a rural locality (a village) in Sizemskoye Rural Settlement, Sheksninsky District, Vologda Oblast, Russia. The population was 3 as of 2002.

Geography 
Gushchino is located 53 km northeast of Sheksna (the district's administrative centre) by road. Rameshka is the nearest rural locality.

References 

Rural localities in Sheksninsky District